Mikalay Ivanow (born 25 January 2000) is a Belarusian professional footballer who plays for Maxline.

References

External links 
 
 

2000 births
Living people
Belarusian footballers
Association football midfielders
FC Dinamo Minsk players
FC Gomel players
FC Isloch Minsk Raion players
FC Naftan Novopolotsk players
FC Minsk players
FC Dnepr Rogachev players